Jorge Reina Schement, Ph.D., was dean of what is now the School of Communication and Information at Rutgers, The State University of New Jersey. Schement is a Professor II of Communication, Professor II of Latino-Hispanic Caribbean Studies, and Professor II of Public Policy at Rutgers.

In 2013 he was named by Rutgers University President Robert Barchi as the Vice Chancellor of Institutional Diversity and Inclusion.

Schement's research and scholarship address issues in the areas of information policy, global telecommunications, the social aspects of the Information Age, Spanish-language media, and information-consumer behavior. More specifically, he has focused on the social and policy consequences of the production and consumption of information, with a special interest in policy as it relates to ethnic minorities.

Schement serves as the editor-in-chief of the Macmillan Encyclopedia of Communication and Information, as well as an editorial board member of: IT & Society, Journal of Media and Religion, Information and Behavior, and Telematics and Informatics.

Prior to his appointment at the School of Communication and Information, Schement was a distinguished professor at Penn State University and a co-director of the Institute for Information Policy at that school. Previously he was a faculty fellow at the Columbia Institute for Tele-Information at Columbia University.

Jorge earned his Ph.D. in Communications from the Institute for Communications Research at Stanford University in 1976, an M.S. in Marketing from the School of Commerce at the University of Illinois Urbana-Champaign in 1972, and a BBA in Management at the Southern Methodist University in 1970. During his time at Southern Methodist University, he was Vice President of Sigma Iota Epsilon.

References

External links
Dean’s Welcome at School of Communication, Information and Library Studies (Rutgers University)
Information Bill of Rights at Internet on The Air (IOTA)
Encyclopedia of Communication and Information
Profile at SourceWatch

Year of birth missing (living people)
Living people
Rutgers University faculty
Stanford University alumni
University of Illinois Urbana-Champaign alumni
Southern Methodist University alumni